Shchekino is a rural locality (a village) in Vakhromeyevskoye Rural Settlement, Kameshkovsky District, Vladimir Oblast, Russia. The population was 71 as of 2010.

Geography 
Shchekino is located on the Talsha River, 19 km north of Kameshkovo (the district's administrative centre) by road. Imeni Maksima Gorkogo is the nearest rural locality.

References 

Rural localities in Kameshkovsky District